The Czech–Slovak Battlegroup also, incorrectly, called the Czech–Slovak Battle Group is an EU Battlegroup, led by the Czech Republic, in which Slovakia also participates.

History
The decision to form the CSB (Czech-Slovak Battlegroup), was made in 2005, and developed in 2006. Between 2006 and 2008, the details of the chain of command were negotiated. The group was active in 2009, and was at full preparedness from 1 July 2009 until 31 December 2009.

Structure
The CSB consists of 2,600 soldiers, 2,200 of which are Czechs, and 400 Slovaks. When at full preparedness, the CSB is capable of rapid deployment to anywhere within  of Brussels.

See also 
Visegrád Battlegroup

References

Battlegroups of the European Union
Military units and formations of the Czech Republic
Military units and formations of Slovakia
Czech Republic–Slovakia military relations
Military units and formations established in 2009